Rajsamand District is a district of the state of Rajasthan in western India.
The city of Rajsamand is the district headquarters. The district was constituted on 10 April 1991 from Udaipur district by carving out 7 tehsils - Bhim, Deogarh, Amet, Kumbhalgarh, Rajsamand, Nathdwara, and Railmagra.

Geography
The district has an area of 4,768 km2.  The Aravalli Range forms the northwestern boundary of the district, across which lies Pali District. Ajmer District lies to the north, Bhilwara District to the northeast and east, Chittorgarh District to the southeast, and Udaipur District to the south.  The district lies in the watershed of the Banas River and its tributaries. Some other rivers are: Ari, Gomati, Chandra and Bhoga.

Demographics

According to the 2011 census Rajsamand district has a population of 1,156,597, roughly equal to the nation of Timor-Leste or the US state of Rhode Island. This gives it a ranking of 405th in India (out of a total of 640). 
Its population growth rate over the decade 2001-2011 was 17.35%. Rajsamand has a sex ratio of 988 females for every 1000 males, and a literacy rate of 63.93%. 15.89% of the population lives in urban areas. Scheduled Castes and Scheduled Tribes make up 12.81% and 13.90% of the population respectively.

At the time of the 2011 Census of India, 75.36% of the population in the district spoke Mewari, 17.19% Rajasthani, 5.30% Hindi and 0.97% Marwari as their first language.

Places to interest 
Rajsamand district had lot of natural and historical places to visit.

 Kumbhalgarh
  Rajsamand Lake
  Charbhuja Temple, Garhbor
 Shrinathji Temple, Nathdwara
  Kumbhalgarh Wildlife Sanctuary
 Haldighati
  Dwarkadheesh Temple
  Deogarh
 Victory memorial at Dewair 
  Todgarh Raoli Sanctuary

References

External links

 Rajsamand District Official website
 Rajsamand District Hindi Website
 Rajsamand Profile

 
Districts of Rajasthan
1991 establishments in Rajasthan
Districts in Udaipur division